Judolia is a genus of beetles in the family Cerambycidae, containing the following species:
 Judolia antecurrens  (Wickham, 1913)† 
 Judolia cometes (Bates, 1884)
 Judolia cordifera (Olivier, 1795)
 Judolia gaurotoides (Casey, 1893)
 Judolia impura (LeConte, 1857)
 Judolia instabilis (Haldeman, 1847)
 Judolia japonica  (Tamanuki, 1942) 
 Judolia montivagans (Couper, 1864)
 Judolia quadrata (LeConte, 1873)
 Judolia scapularis (Van Dyke, 1920)
 Judolia sexmaculata  (Linnaeus, 1758) 
 Judolia sexspilota (LeConte, 1859)
 Judolia swainei (Hopping, 1922)

References

 
Cerambycidae genera